Events from the year 1491 in France

Incumbents
 Monarch – Charles VIII

Events

Births

Full date missing
Jacques Cartier, explorer (died 1557)
Suzanne, Duchess of Bourbon, duchess (died 1521)

Deaths

Full date missing
John II, Count of Nevers, nobleman (born 1415)
Jean Balue, cardinal and minister (born c.1421)
Philippe Basiron, composer, singer and organist (born c.1449)

See also

References

1490s in France